Engleside is a historic estate located near Dansville in Livingston County, New York. The estate includes the large Greek Revival style main house, barn, single bay garage, and a combination laundry / drying house / privy building. The main house was built around 1848.  It is composed of a two-story three bay, side hall entrance main block surmounted by a hipped roof with a long wing.   The property also features a stone retaining wall with integrated quarter circle flights of steps and a cast iron fountain.

It was listed on the National Register of Historic Places in 2009.

References

Houses on the National Register of Historic Places in New York (state)
Greek Revival houses in New York (state)
Houses in Livingston County, New York
National Register of Historic Places in Livingston County, New York